Debra M. Davis (born October 11, 1959) is an American politician who represents district 28 in the Maryland House of Delegates.

Background
Davis was born in Cheverly, Maryland, on October 11, 1959, where she attended Frederick Douglass High School in Croom, Maryland. In 1981, she graduated from the University of Maryland with a Bachelor of Science degree in Criminology. After attending the University of Baltimore School of Law where she earned a Juris Doctor, she was admitted to the Maryland Bar in 1995 and to the District of Columbia Bar in 1996.

In 2010, Davis was elected to the Charles County Board of Commissioners, representing the Charles County District 2. During her two terms as commissioner, she gained the reputation as a maverick, often voting against the majority on issues large and small. During her second term, she also served as the Chair of the Board of Trustees for the Local Government Insurance Trust, becoming the first African-American to serve as LGIT Chair.

In January 2018, Davis declared her candidacy for state delegate in Maryland's 28th legislative district. In the general election, Davis earned 23.8 percent of the vote, with incumbents C. T. Wilson and Edith J. Patterson earning 22.8 percent and 23.2 percent respectively and all precincts reporting.

In the legislature
Davis has been a member of the Maryland House of Delegates since January 9, 2019.

Committee assignments
 Judiciary Committee, 2019– (juvenile law subcommittee, 2019–20; public safety subcommittee, 2019–; criminal law & procedure subcommittee, 2021–)
 Chair, House Re-entry Work Group, 2021
 Work Group to Address Police Reform and Accountability in Maryland, 2020

Other memberships
 Legislative Black Caucus of Maryland, 2019– (chair, criminal justice subcommittee); Maryland Legislative Transit Caucus, 2019–
 Women Legislators of Maryland, 2019–

Political positions

Education
Davis introduced legislation in the 2021 session that would expand access to Supplemental Nutrition Assistance Program (SNAP) assistance to eligible college students. The bill passed and went into effect on June 1, 2021.

Policing
Davis introduced legislation in the 2021 session that would establish a statewide police use-of-force policy. The bill received a hearing in subcommittee, but never received a vote.

Transportation
Davis introduced legislation in the 2021 session that would advance the Southern Maryland Rapid Transit, a 19-mile rail project from Branch Avenue Metro station in Suitland-Silver Hill to White Plains, Maryland. The bill passed and was signed by Governor Larry Hogan.

Electoral history

References

Democratic Party members of the Maryland House of Delegates
Living people
African-American state legislators in Maryland
University of Baltimore School of Law alumni
Maryland lawyers
21st-century American politicians
People from Charles County, Maryland
1959 births
21st-century American women politicians
Women state legislators in Maryland
21st-century African-American women
21st-century African-American politicians
20th-century African-American people
20th-century African-American women
County commissioners in Maryland